Alistair "Ali" Hepher (born 3 October 1974) is a rugby union player and coach. He played at Fly-half for Northampton. Since retiring from playing he has worked as a coach at Bedford RFC, Northampton and Exeter Chiefs.

Club career
Hepher was part of the Northampton team that won the 2000 Heineken Cup Final.

International career
Hepher was called up to the senior England squad by Clive Woodward for the 2000 England rugby union tour of South Africa as a replacement for Alex King. However he was ultimately never capped at this level.

References

External links
Career profile

1974 births
Living people
English rugby union players
Northampton Saints players
Rugby union players from Northumberland
Rugby union players from Ashington